Heremakono may refer to:

Waiting for Happiness - a Mauritanian film
Heremakono, Mali
 an alternative spelling of Hérémakonon, a town in Guinea